John Erskine, 23rd Earl of Mar may refer to:

 John Erskine, Earl of Mar (1675–1732) (known as "Bobbing John"), regarded as 23rd earl by some sources, and 22nd by others
 John Erskine, Earl of Mar (1741–1825), his grandson, regarded as 24th earl by some sources, and 23rd by others

See also 
Earl of Mar#Notes